Catasse may refer to:

 Carlos Catasse (1944–2010), Chilean artist
 Catassing